The Women's team pursuit at the 2013 UEC European Track Championships was held on 18 October 2013. 9 nations participated. This was the first time the event had been held in the new four person, 4000 metres format. Notwithstanding the change in format, the event continued to be dominated by Great Britain, who won the final against Poland in a new world record.

Results
The event was held over two rounds, both run on the same day. all teams competed in the qualification round, while the teams with the fastest 2 teams raced for gold in the final. The teams with the third and fourth fast times raced in the bronze medal final. The Great Britain team set a new world record in qualification, bettering their own previous mark. In the final, with a slightly revised line up, they repeated the feat against fellow finalists Poland to set a second world record. In the bronze medal ride off, russia held off the team from Belgium for the last medal.

Qualifying

Finals

References

Women's team pursuit
European Track Championships – Women's team pursuit